The Central Desert Region  is a local government area of the Northern Territory, Australia, administered by the Central Desert Regional Council (formerly Central Desert Shire). The council's main towns are Ti-Tree, Yuendumu, and Lajamanu.

History
In October 2006 the Northern Territory Government announced the reform of local government areas. The intention of the reform was to improve and expand the delivery of services to towns and communities across the Northern Territory by establishing eleven new Shires. The Central Desert Shire was created on 1 July 2008.

Elections of councillors were held on 25 October 2008. The President (Mayor) of the Central Desert Regional Council is Adrian Dixon and the Deputy President is Warren Williams since 28 August 2017.

Much of the council's area had been unincorporated, and several Community Government Councils were merged into the Central Desert Region. These were:
 Anmatjere CGC
 Arltarlpilta CGC
 Lajamanu CGC
 Yuendumu CGC

Changes to the NT Local Government Legislation in 2013 changed the names of Shire to Regional Councils and thus the Central Desert Shire became the Central Desert Regional Council with effect from 1 January 2014.

Wards
The Central Desert Regional Council is divided into four wards, which is governed by 12 councillors:
 Northern Tanami (2)
 Southern Tanami (4)
 Anmatjere       (4)
 Akityarre       (2)

Localities and communities
Land within the Central Desert Region was divided in 2007 into bounded areas for the purpose of creating an address for a property.  The bounded areas are called "localities", with those localities associated with Aboriginal communities being called "communities".

Localities
Anatye 
Anmatjere (part) 
Chilla Well 
Gurindji    
Hart    
Lake Mackay (part) 
Sandover (part) 
Tanami
Ti-Tree

Communities
Atitjere   
Engawala   
Lajamanu 
Laramba
Nyirripi  
Willowra  
Wilora
Yuelamu   
Yuendumu

References

External links
www.centraldesert.nt.gov.au

 
Central Desert Regional Council